The 1945–46 NHL season was the 29th season of the National Hockey League. The Montreal Canadiens won the Stanley Cup, defeating the Boston Bruins for the team's sixth championship.

League business
Since World War II had ended, the NHL and the Canadian Amateur Hockey Association (CAHA) reverted to the pre-war agreement not to sign any junior ice hockey players without permission. CAHA secretary George Dudley stated that tryout contracts must be honoured, and junior-aged players on NHL reserve lists must be reinstated as amateurs to return to the CAHA. The wartime practice of the NHL borrowing amateur players for three games or less was discontinued. The NHL and the CAHA discussed updates the financial terms of the agreement. The NHL offered a flat payment of $20,000 to signing amateurs, which Dudley felt it was too low. The CAHA ultimately accepted the lump sum payment, preferring not to break its alliance with the NHL.

Synchronized red lights to signal goals were made obligatory for all NHL rinks.

It was rumoured in the press that Lester Patrick planned to retire as general manager of the New York Rangers. On February 22, 1946, he announced his retirement from the general manager position, however he would stay on as vice president of Madison Square Garden.

The NHL and the International Ice Hockey Association agreed to mutually enforce suspensions for players not fulfilling a tryout contract.

Regular season

Veterans came back to their teams this year, as World War II ended, but many found they could not regain their form. One who did regain his form was the man formerly known as "Mr. Zero"—Boston Bruins' goaltender Frank Brimsek. He was shelled in an 8–3 contest with Chicago, but got better game by game. The Bruins had first place at one point, then finished second. Brimsek made the Second All-Star Team as a result.

Max Bentley of Chicago led the league in scoring, and, because of the "Pony Line" including him, his brother Doug and Bill Mosienko, the Black Hawks were in first place at one point. But misfortune hit the Hawks when Doug Bentley injured his knee in a January 23 game and the team sagged.

Frank Patrick, former Pacific Coast Hockey Association president and former managing director for the NHL, suffered a heart attack and was not released from the hospital for several weeks.

A bombshell exploded on January 30, 1946, when defenceman Babe Pratt was expelled from the NHL for betting on games. However, he only bet on his own team and appealed his expulsion. On his promise he would not bet on any more games, he was reinstated. Pratt missed 9 games during his suspension.

Maple Leaf Gaye Stewart led the league in goals with 37, but Toronto finished fifth and missed the playoffs for the first time since playing at Maple Leaf Gardens.

Bill Durnan equalled George Hainsworth's record of three consecutive Vezina Trophies and led the league in shutouts with 4.

Final standings

Playoffs

Playoff bracket

Semifinals

(1) Montreal Canadiens vs. (3) Chicago Black Hawks

The Montreal Canadiens finished first in the league with 61 points. The Chicago Blackhawks finished third with 53 points. This was the seventh playoff meeting between these two teams with the teams splitting the six previous series. They last met in the 1944 Stanley Cup Finals where Montreal won in four games. Montreal won this year's ten game regular season series earning eleven of twenty points.

(2) Boston Bruins vs. (4) Detroit Red Wings

The Boston Bruins finished second in the league with 56 points. The Detroit Red Wings finished fourth with 50 points. This was the fifth playoff meeting between these two teams with Detroit winning the three of the four previous series. They last met in the previous year's Stanley Cup Semifinals where the Red Wings won in seven games. Boston won this year's ten game regular season series earning eleven of twenty points.

Stanley Cup Finals

This was the fifth playoff meeting between these two teams with the teams splitting the four previous series. They last met in the 1943 Stanley Cup Semifinals where Boston won in five games. Montreal won this year's ten game regular season series earning eleven of twenty points.

Awards
The NHL changed the criteria for the Vezina Trophy to award it to the goaltender who plays the most games for the team which gives up the fewest goals in the season.

Player statistics

Scoring leaders
Note: GP = Games played, G = Goals, A = Assists, PTS = Points, PIM = Penalties in minutes

Source: NHL

Leading goaltenders

Note: GP = Games played; Min – Minutes played; GA = Goals against; GAA = Goals against average; W = Wins; L = Losses; T = Ties; SO = Shutouts

Coaches
Boston Bruins: Dit Clapper
Chicago Black Hawks: Johnny Gottselig
Detroit Red Wings: Jack Adams
Montreal Canadiens: Dick Irvin
New York Rangers: Frank Boucher
Toronto Maple Leafs: Hap Day

Debuts
The following is a list of players of note who played their first NHL game in 1945–46 (listed with their first team, asterisk(*) marks debut in playoffs):
Leo Reise Jr., Chicago Black Hawks
George Gee, Chicago Black Hawks
Jimmy Peters, Montreal Canadiens
Cal Gardner, New York Rangers
Edgar Laprade, New York Rangers
Tony Leswick, New York Rangers
Jimmy Thomson, Toronto Maple Leafs

Last games
The following is a list of players of note that played their last game in the NHL in 1945–46 (listed with their last team):
Herb Cain, Boston Bruins (Last active Montreal Maroons player)
Mike Karakas, Chicago Black Hawks
Carl Liscombe, Detroit Red Wings
Earl Seibert, Detroit Red Wings
Flash Hollett, Detroit Red Wings (Last active Ottawa Senators player)
Mud Bruneteau, Detroit Red Wings
Syd Howe, Detroit Red Wings (last active Philadelphia Quakers player
Ott Heller, New York Rangers
Lynn Patrick, New York Rangers
Frank McCool, Toronto Maple Leafs
Bob Davidson, Toronto Maple Leafs
Sweeney Schriner, Toronto Maple Leafs
Lorne Carr, Toronto Maple Leafs
Mel Hill, Toronto Maple Leafs

See also 
 1945-46 NHL transactions
 List of Stanley Cup champions
 1945 in sports
 1946 in sports

References 
 
 
 
 
 
 

Notes

External links
 Hockey Database
 NHL.com

 
1
1